Manuel Cappai (born 9 October 1992 in Cagliari) is an Italian boxer who competed at the 2012 Summer Olympics in the light flyweight division where he lost in the first round to Mark Anthony Barriga. Cappai won a bronze medal in the flyweight division at the 2018 Mediterranean Games.

Cappai an athlete of the Gruppo Sportivo Fiamme Oro.

References

1992 births
Living people
Boxers at the 2012 Summer Olympics
Boxers at the 2016 Summer Olympics
Olympic boxers of Italy
Mediterranean Games bronze medalists for Italy
Competitors at the 2018 Mediterranean Games
Sportspeople from Cagliari
Italian male boxers
Mediterranean Games medalists in boxing
Boxers at the 2019 European Games
European Games medalists in boxing
European Games bronze medalists for Italy
Boxers of Fiamme Oro
Flyweight boxers
21st-century Italian people